Gryllus vernalis, the northern wood cricket, is a species of cricket native to deciduous woods of the midwestern United States, where its primary habitat is leaf litter. It can be identified by its totally black exoskeleton (with the occasional red patch on the femora) and its wide pronotum.

References

vernalis
Insects described in 1920